The Dellet Plantation, also known as Dellet Park, is a plantation and historic district about 3 miles northwest of the ghost town of Claiborne, Monroe County, Alabama. The plantation was established by James Dellet, a prominent judge and United States Congressman,  during the late 1810s, and transitioned from slave labor to tenant farming after the Civil War. The Federal style plantation house, with a two-tiered Doric portico on the front, was built between 1835 and 1840 by Dellet.

References

Federal architecture in Alabama
National Register of Historic Places in Monroe County, Alabama
Houses on the National Register of Historic Places in Alabama
Plantation houses in Alabama
Historic districts in Monroe County, Alabama
Houses in Monroe County, Alabama
Historic districts on the National Register of Historic Places in Alabama